Milada Absolonová is a retired slalom canoeist who competed for Czechoslovakia in the mid-to-late 1960s. She won a silver medal in the mixed C-2 team event at the 1965 ICF Canoe Slalom World Championships in Spittal.

References

External links 
 Milada ABSOLONOVA at CanoeSlalom.net

Czechoslovak female canoeists
Possibly living people
Year of birth missing
Medalists at the ICF Canoe Slalom World Championships